Duke of Peñaranda de Duero, commonly known as Duke of Peñaranda, is a title of Spanish nobility that is accompanied by the dignity of Grandee of Spain. It was granted to Juan de Zúñiga y Bazán on 22 May 1608 by king Philip III. Juan de Zúñiga was Viceroy of Catalonia and Viceroy of Naples.

Dukes of Peñaranda de Duero (1608)
 Juan de Zúñiga y Bazán, 1st Duke of Peñaranda
 Diego de Zúñiga y Pacheco, 2nd Duke of Peñaranda
 Francisco de Zúñiga y Sandoval, 3rd Duke of Peñaranda
 Diego de Zúñiga y Enríquez de Acevedo, 4th Duke of Peñaranda
 Fernando de Zúñiga y Enríquez de Acevedo, 5th Duke of Peñaranda
 Isidro de Zúñiga y Enríquez de Acevedo, 6th Duke of Peñaranda
 Isidro de Zúñiga y Valdés, 7th Duke of Peñaranda
 Ana María de Zúñiga y Enríquez de Acevedo, 8th Duchess of Peñaranda
 Joaquín José de Chaves y Zúñiga, 9th Duke of Peñaranda
 Pedro Regalado de Zúñiga y Girón, 10th Duke of Peñaranda
 Antonio de Zúñiga y Ayala, 11th Duke of Peñaranda
 Pedro de Alcántara de Zúñiga y Girón, 12th Duke of Peñaranda
 María del Carmen Josefa de Zúñiga y Fernández de Velasco, 13th Duchess of Peñaranda
 Eugenio de Palafox y Portocarrero, 14th Duke of Peñaranda
 Cipriano Palafox y Portocarrero, 15th Duke of Peñaranda
 Maria Francisca de Sales Palafox y Kirkpatrick, 16th Duchess of Peñaranda
 Carlos María Fitz-James Stuart y Palafox, 17th Duke of Peñaranda
 Hernando Fitz-James Stuart y Falcó, 18th Duke of Peñaranda
 Fernando Fitz-James Stuart y Saavedra, 19th Duke of Peñaranda
 Jacobo Hernando Fitz-James Stuart y Gómez, 20th Duke of Peñaranda

See also
List of dukes in the peerage of Spain
List of current Grandees of Spain

References 

Dukedoms of Spain
Grandees of Spain
Lists of dukes
Lists of Spanish nobility